Skulduggery Pleasant: Last Stand of Dead Men is a young adult and fantasy novel written by Derek Landy, published in August 2013. It is the eighth of the Skulduggery Pleasant series and the sequel to Skulduggery Pleasant: Kingdom of the Wicked.

The story follows the sorcerers/detectives Valkyrie Cain and Skulduggery Pleasant as they team up with the Dead Men to uncover the conspiracy behind the war between the Sanctuaries. Meanwhile, an ancient being, Darquesse, is on the verge of rising to the surface and bringing about the end of the world. 

In 2013 Skulduggery Pleasant: Last Stand of Dead Men won the Senior Irish Children's Book of the Year, and was released in the US and Canada in 2018. HarperCollins Audio published the unabridged audio book read by Rupert Degas.

Plot summary

Donegan Bane, Gracious O'Callahan and Valkyrie Cain head to a Witch's cabin to seek information about the recent disappearance of Skulduggery Pleasant. They meet the Witch's granddaughter, Misery, and convince her to let them into the basement. They meet the resident witch: Dubhog Ni Broin, who holds Skulduggery captive. Broin reveals that a Warlock tried to convince her and her sisters to join with the Warlock's leader, Charivari, to go to war.

During a meeting between the Irish Council of Elders, the governors of the Irish magical community, Ghastly Bespoke, Erskine Ravel and Madame Mist talk with English Elder Illori Reticent. Reticent attempts to convince the Irish Council to allow the Supreme Council, an international collective, to form a Council of Elders with nine members, citing fears that Ireland is unstable and vulnerable to further disasters. Reticent tries to convince the council to shut down the Accelerator, but Grand Mage Ravel refuses on both accounts.

Afterwards, Valkyrie and her family celebrate her eighteenth birthday and her parents present her with an orange car which Valkyrie calls the "Oompa-Loompa". She and Skulduggery meet Solomon Wreath, a Necromancer who Valkyrie with a more potent ring to store her Necromancer power.

Elder Ghastly Bespoke is being tracked, and he follows the trackers to the Accelerator, where Bernard Sult and other Supreme Council members are planting explosives to destroy the device. Bespoke manages to defeat the Council members but Sult detonates the bombs, though the Accelerator is not damaged. Ravel and the Cleavers arrive to arrest Sult and the mages.

Valkyrie visits China Sorrows to discuss who an unidentified man with golden eyes could be and how he hides himself from other people's memories. Sorrows tells her that a type of amethyst crystal exists which could induce a level of amnesia so the thoughts can be erased, saying that most of the crystals are locked away carefully. Sorrows remarks that one could be present in the Sanctuary building in Roarhaven.

Scapegrace, now in a woman's body,and his servant Thrasher return to Roarhaven after training under Grandmaster Ping.

At the Sanctuary, Valkyrie meets Saracen Rue. The two talk with Ravel, who reveals that a robot called the Engineer was the only machine capable of deactivating the Accelerator. Ravel informs them that the Supreme Council are demanding the release of Sult and arresting Irish mages (including Dexter Vex) all over the world, accusing them of espionage. The list of mages arrested includes Vex. Skulduggery and Valkyrie head to the Repository, hoping to find the amethyst crystal mentioned by Sorrows. They locate it, with Skulduggery realizing that the crystals are so rare that the man with the golden eyes could have been using the Sanctuary's crystal, meaning the man could be a Sanctuary Mage. They receive a message from the Sensitive Cassandra Pharos who informs them she is going to have a vision.

Vex is arrested in America alongside fellow Irish mage Caius Caviler. Caius is escorted by Grim – the ex-bodyguard of former Grand Mage Strom, who lost his job following Strom's assassination. Caius lunges at Grim, but Grim kills him. Caius's death further inflames tensions between the Irish Sanctuary and the Supreme Council. The Irish mages find Sult is not in his cell. The Supreme Council's channel, which is broadcast internationally, is hacked by Syc and Portia – the Children of the Spider. They murder Sult on live TV, saying that if the Supreme Council harms any Irish mages, it will be a "life for a life".

Skulduggery and Valkyrie go to Pharos's house to witness her new vision. In this vision, Bespoke kisses Tanith Low, implying that Tanith is free of the Remnant; Ravel is shackled behind his back in his Elder robes; Valkyrie pleads not to watch something again while holding an unrecognizable object in her hand; Darquesse kills Desmond, Melissa, Alison Edgley and Skulduggery. Pharos alerts them that people are outside to kill them. Skulduggery and Valkyrie go outside Cassandra's house, meeting a man who Skulduggery recognises from the war with Mevolent. They are told of Sult's murder and that the Supreme Council are assassinating potential threats, with Skulduggery and Valkyrie at the top of the list. The duo successfully subdue their enemies. A shield is established over Ireland.

The Supreme Council meet to discuss the Irish Sanctuary's actions. The German Grand Mage, Wahrheit, informs the Council that the Irish have set up a forcefield dome to prevent new entries of mages. The Council plots to assassinate prominent Irish mages such as Sorrows, many of the Sensitives in Ireland and Fletcher Renn.

Fletcher is targeted; his girlfriend Myra turns out to be a mortal assassin. Before she can kill him, he escapes and teleports to the Irish Sanctuary. Anton Shudder is targeted at the Midnight Hotel; his guests are revealed to be Supreme Council soldiers who attack him, but he escapes through a hidden exit. An assassin attempts to kill Finbar Wrong, but he foresaw the assassin coming and poisoned the handle of a mug of tea, killing the man. China Sorrows is targeted by Vincent Foe's gang. She escapes, but they continue to chase her.

Following his arrest, Vex is relocated with an escort of three Cleavers. One is female, an infrequent occurrence due to the Cleaver training process. The female Cleaver kills the other two, revealing herself to be Tanith, who abducts him.

After arriving in Ireland, Scapegrace and Thrasher continue their vigilante mission trying to find Silas Nadir through their disguises as the Dark and Stormy Knight and the Village Idiot respectively. Tanith and Billy-Ray Sanguine hand Vex over to Skulduggery, Bespoke and Valkyrie and ask to join the Irish. After a brief scuffle between Bespoke and Sanguine, the three agree and send Tanith and Sanguine with Donegan and Gracious to disable the Midnight Hotel and prevent the Supreme Council avoiding the shield.

The Supreme Council recruits General Mantis, who is regarded as a "secret weapon" against Mevolent. Mantis is sent with 80 other sorcerers into the Midnight Hotel and into Ireland. Sanguine disables the hotel, but he and Tanith are captured. Tanith is later freed by Aurora Jane and the four escape.

At the Irish Sanctuary, the Dead Men reform with Skulduggery, Erskine Ravel, Ghastly, Anton, Saracen and Vex. Valkyrie is recruited to the Dead Men as the seventh member. Their mission is to retrieve the Engineer, which is being held at the French Sanctuary. They tip off the Australian and African Sanctuary in the hope that they will assist and join the war. On their journey, the Dead Men encounter a ghost town plagued by Wraiths that invade in the evenings. They find the former French Grand Mage, Trebuchet, who helps the Dead Men infiltrate the French Sanctuary by informing them of an entrance. After a conflict, they retrieve the Engineer and bring it to Ireland, with the assistance of the Australian and African Sanctuaries.

A Warlock, claiming to be Charivari, kills several mages in the African Sanctuary and investigates links between the murders of Warlocks and Department X, a non-existent mortal organization.

The Irish Sanctuary places a decoy army of Hollow Men in the Keep, a disused military base, in the hope that Mantis is caught in the trap. The Keep is located in low ground, against a cliffside. The Irish Sanctuary also have the aid of the vampire Moloch, with Skulduggery and Valkyrie promising him another building to recruit vampires. He provides 50 vampires for the Irish, commanding them to only attack Mantis' men. The Engineer is kept at the Keep as bait, but it is damaged. It is now revealed that it must shut down the Accelerator, which will cause an explosion of magic that will supercharge the world's population and cause the end of humanity. The Engineer's memory unit is damaged, and it cannot shut the Accelerator down. The replacement is held at the English Sanctuary.

Elder Madame Mist sets up a shield around Roarhaven while fellow Elders Bespoke and Ravel have been away as part of war missions.

The trap at the Keep is sprung. Fletcher and the Monster Hunters are stationed at the Keep, and as soon as Mantis takes the bait, they teleport away. A battle begins, but the vampires are not present. Valkyrie discovers that Moloch had them contained in a cage and would release them upon order, but Moloch had been decapitated by Dusk. Dusk refuses to open the cage as he broke the vampire code by killing another, and the vampires would kill him.

Valkyrie fights in the battle, but is captured alongside Tanith and Gracious O'Callahan. A Sensitive pries into her mind in an attempt to find information. Darquesse subdues the Sensitive, who remains contained in Valkyrie's mind, and frees Tanith and Gracious. They escape.

Valkyrie returns home and speaks with her reflection. When the reflection goes inside the mirror, it gives Valkyrie certain memories: of her being tortured and of her killing Carol. A fight breaks out, with the reflection grabs the Sceptre of the Ancients. It destroys the mirror it came from, preventing it from returning. They fight until their parents come home, and Valkyrie is forced to flee before her parents can see her face.

Valkyrie tells Skulduggery about what the reflection did, and Skulduggery promises that they will get her family back. Ravel stops Skulduggery and Valkyrie from investigating the murder in the African Sanctuary, and sends the Monster Hunters and Fletcher instead. During their visit, Fletcher is kidnapped.

Skulduggery, Vex, Saracen, Valkyrie, Tanith and Sanguine go to the English Sanctuary to get the Engineer's memory, which they manage to do, while Bespoke, Shudder and Ravel go to the Sanctuary to investigate Mist's recent actions.

Sorrows, after months of being on the run, goes to the Church of the Faceless to confront Eliza Scorn. She overpowers Eliza, but her assailants return and she escapes to the Irish Sanctuary.

Bespoke, Shudder and Ravel enter the Sanctuary and find that the Children of the Spider are there with the Black Cleaver – the resurrected White Cleaver. Bespoke orders the Cleavers to attack Mist, but cannot, as an Elder cannot order an attack on another Elder. Mist sends a swarm of Cleavers to kill Shudder. His gist attempts to emerge but he is decapitated. Ravel stabs Bespoke in the throat, apologizing to him as he chokes on his blood. In his dying moments, Bespoke looks up into Ravel's golden eyes.

Ravel states his plans for sorcerers to rule over mortals. In a moment of anger, he nearly kills Syc for insulting Bespoke, but he stops, deeming Syc unworthy of being killed with "a blade stained with the blood of a great man". He reveals his intention to use Kenny Dunne to reveal magic to the mortal world.

Scapegrace and Thrasher continue their search for Silas. The pair see someone shunt and them. Scapegrace escapes.

Skulduggery and Valkyrie look for Fletcher's kidnappers: the Brides of Blood Tears. Valkyrie changes into one of their clothes. She finds Skulduggery and Fletcher trapped and fights a Bride. Valkyrie accidentally kills her with a spear of Necromancy.

Darquesse conflicts with Valkyrie's thoughts, and as they escape, Darquesse tricks Valkyrie into taking the wrong turn. She is trapped in a large room surrounded by hundreds of Brides of Blood Tears. As her limbs are torn off, Valkyrie gives in to Darquesse, and she obliterates all the Brides. Fletcher and Skulduggery turn back to rescue her, but Darquesse flies off.

Fletcher goes to the Reflection, who talks to him about Valkyrie, which ends with her kissing him.

The reflection goes to Gordon's house, believing it to be her responsibility to stop Darquesse. She walks in to hear Vex yelling at Skulduggery. Skulduggery is confident that he can stop Darquesse, and the reflection introduces herself as Stephanie, asserting itself as a real person. Skulduggery points his gun between her eyes, about to avenge Valkyrie and her family. Fletcher attempts to defend her, but learns about what she did. The reflection claims as a defence that her emotions were not developed enough for her to understand what she was doing. Skulduggery lets her live because without her, her parents will get worried. The reflection reveals that she has the Sceptre, and they discuss killing the reflection to gain access to its power. Tanith nearly kills the reflection, but is intercepted by Skulduggery. Fletcher takes her away.

Erskine delivers a speech to Roarhaven about overrunning the world. He also discusses his regret over murdering Anton and Ghastly. He ends with his Dimensional Shunter turning the town of Roarhaven into Roarhaven City.

Skulduggery, Saracen, Dexter, the Monster Hunters and the reflection get into Roarhaven and see China. It is revealed that Skulduggery forgave China at some point.

China is forced to tell Mist and Ravel that she spotted Skulduggery. She is forced to lure them into a trap - if she doesn't, they will kill her. Ravel then states how after the world is governed by Sorcerers, he will admit to his crimes and go to jail.

Although Skulduggery knows that it is a trap, he allows himself and the others to be captured by Ravel. Erskine believes that he is not like Serpine or other villains. Skulduggery admits the Dead Men have fallen – only three out of seven remain.

The Warlocks attack Roarhaven. The Irish Sanctuary refuses to fight for Ravel, so Ravel lets Skulduggery take charge, and the Battle of Roarhaven begins. Mantis attempts to send a small party with cloaking spheres to kill Charivari, but they are captured with Mantis and burned on the stake.

It is revealed that the Accelerator needs two weeks to shut down. Ravel sends some mages to use it, and they join the battle. The Monster Hunters, Saracen, Vex and the reflection engage Charivari in battle, and the reflection blasts him with the Sceptre. Darquesse enters Roarhaven, killing anything that comes in her path.

Skulduggery and China go after Ravel. They fight the Black Cleaver, and as it is about to decapitate him, Skulduggery attacks it with Necromancy.

Kenny and his friend Patrick Slattery are present during the battle filming its events until Slattery is killed and Kenny sees the reflection disappear, and he flees the scene.

Skulduggery fights Ravel and China fights Madame Mist. China accepts that she is going to die, and uses a last resort tattoo. Her body is engulfed in fire. She places her hands on Mist's shoulders and kills her. Before China dies, Darquesse breaks through the ceiling.

Skulduggery approaches her and she flings him aside. Darquesse places a small ball of light inside Ravel, cursing him with 23 hours of unbearable agony every day, with the pain increasing if his body gets used to it. China touches Darquesse, and transfers heat to her, which heals China. Darquesse says that Valkyrie is gone, and she flies off.

Afterwards, Saracen, Vex and Skulduggery state that Roarhaven will become a prison and all the citizens are charged as Ravel's accomplices. They ask the Engineer to shut down the Accelerator; it explains that is the Accelerator is not shut down within the four weeks of activation, a soul must be willingly given to seal off the Accelerator from the source of all magic; if a sacrifice is not made within 23 days, the Accelerator will self-destruct. China declares herself Grand Mage to no objection. She orders Vex and Saracen to stop the 19 supercharged mages and Skulduggery must stop Darquesse. Skulduggery recruits the reflection, on the condition that it can kill Darquesse if she must.

Characters

 The Monster Hunters: Donegan Bane and Gracious O'Callahan, collectively known as the Monster Hunters, are former allies of Dexter Vex who assist the Dead Men in their cause.

 Charivari: a dark sorcerer and French leader of the Warlocks whom The Man with Golden Eyes seeks to manipulate.

 Madame Mist: an Elder of the Irish Sanctuary and Child of the Spider, allied with The Man with Golden Eyes.

 The Engineer: the robotic guard of the "Accelerator", a device capable of temporarily boosting one's magical capabilities.

 Vaurien Scapegrace: a sorcerer and former zombie whose brain has been temporarily placed into a female body, who seeks to track down serial killer Silas Nadir.

 Bernard Sult: the administrator of the American Sanctuary who comes to the Irish Sanctuary, whose outdated report combined with the assassination of Quintin Strom led to the beginning of the War of the Sanctuaries.

 Darquesse: the True Name of Valkyrie Cain, a being foretold to overtake her physical form and bring about the end of the world.

References

External links

Skulduggery Pleasant UK, Australia and New Zealand Official Website
Skulduggery Pleasant US and Canada Official Website

2013 children's books
2013 Irish novels
HarperCollins books
Irish fantasy novels
Skulduggery Pleasant books